A Lowland Cinderella is a 1921 British silent romance film adaptation of S. R. Crockett's novel directed by Sidney Morgan and starring Joan Morgan, Ralph Forbes and George Foley.

Plot
A 1920s version of the Cinderella story, the film tells the story of a Scottish girl, Hester Stirling, whose father, David Stirling, a gold prospector in South Africa, leaves behind a bag full of precious stones. Her evil guardian, Dr. Silvanus Torpichan, appropriates it and forces her to work as a servant in his home.

Cast
 Joan Morgan as Hester Stirling  
 Ralph Forbes as Master of Darrock
 George Foley as David Stirling 
 Mary Carnegie as Mrs. Torpichan  
 Mavis Clair as Ethel Torpichan  
 Nell Emerald as Megsy 
 Eileen Grace as Claudia Torpichan  
 Charles Levey as Dr. Silvanus Torpichan  
 Kate Phillips as Grandmother Stirling  
 Cecil Susands as Tom Torpichan  
 Frances Wetherall as Duchess of Niddisdale

References

Bibliography
 Low, Rachael. The History of the British Film 1918-1929. George Allen & Unwin, 1971.

External links
 
  A Lowland Cinderella (1921) at the British Film Institute
  A Lowland Cinderella at the Screen Archive South East - University of Brighton

1921 films
British romance films
British silent feature films
Films directed by Sidney Morgan
1920s romance films
Films based on British novels
British black-and-white films
Films set in Scotland
1920s English-language films
1920s British films